Gang colors include clothing, accessories, or tattoos of a specific color or colors that represent an affiliation to a specific gang or gang branch.

History

England
The first recorded criminal street gangs in England were organized in London in the early 1600s and identified and apprehended by an early form of British city police, the Bow Street Runners. Early urban gangs in London and other British cities of this period went by the names of the Muns, Mohocks, Hectors, Bawcubites, Bickers, Bugles, Blues, Bravadoes, Tittyre Tus, Tuquoques, Roysters, Scowrers, Dead Boys, Circling Boys, and Roaring Boys with each gang distinguishing its membership affiliation by using a different colored ribbon attached to their clothing.

United States
The earliest criminal street gangs in the United States were in New York City, from the 1820s–1860s, were politically-aligned with one of two prominent political parties, the anti-immigrant  Nativist, Know Nothing Party or Irish immigrant-based Tammany Hall of the Democratic Party who wore distinctive gang colors to differentiate themselves from their allies and rivals. The most notorious and prominent of the New York gangs who could field 50–200 members per gang were the Nativist Bowery Boys, Atlantic Guards, and Plug Uglies versus the Irish American gangs of the Dead Rabbits, Roach Guards, and Shirt Tails.

The Roach Guards wore a blue stripe on their trousers and the Atlantic Guards and Dead Rabbits wore a red trouser stripe.  The Bowery Boys wore neckerchiefs, red shirts, tall stove pipe hats, long, black, frock coats, and trousers tucked into high heel calf boots to identify them with their New York City Fire Department volunteer fire company origins and Nativist affiliations.

Types of colors

Bandanas 
The most recognizable form of gang affiliation is based on color. Bandanas come in a wide range of colors and can be paired with other pieces of clothing to represent all colors of the gang. Not only are bandanas an easy way to show gang affiliation they are also easy to remove if the situation calls for it (i.e. if confronted by law enforcement). Gang members are known for wearing bandanas around their face as a mask, or in their pocket, with it sticking out.

Jerseys 
Jerseys are common in the gang world for brandishing the colors of a member's gang. They represent the gang's city or region, contain multiple colors and often display specific numbers or words.

Today

Legal ramifications 
The prevalence of gang colors has declined in popularity over the past few years. In order to crack down on gang related crimes legislation has been passed to increase penalties for crimes committed by gangs or gang members. For example, in some states, if a gang member commits a Class A misdemeanor, the highest level misdemeanor crime, then that offense is classified as a felony because the individual is a member of a criminal street gang.

See also
Gang patch
Colors (motorcycling)
School colors
Sports uniform

References

Colors
Street fashion